Glipostenoda brunnescens is a species of beetle in the genus Glipostenoda. It was described in 1952.

References

brunnescens
Beetles described in 1952